The 2013 NACAM Rally Championship is the sixth season of the NACAM Rally Championship. This Championship is the FIA regional rally championship for the North America and Central America (NACAM) region. The season began April 20 in Oaxaca, Mexico, and is scheduled to end November 24 in Jamaica, after six events.

Reigning champion Ricardo Triviño won his fourth NACAM championship, winning four of the six rallies, three of them outright. Trivino won by 21 points over Venezuelan driver Alejandro Lombardo. Costa Rican driver Andrés Molina won a season long battle with Mexican Carlos Izquierdo for third in the championship. Lombardo and Molina were the only drivers to take first place in NACAM points away from Triviño, having done so at the Peruvia Rally Cañete and the Costa Rican Rally Costa del Pacifico respectively.

Race calendar and results
The 2013 NACAM Rally Championship is as follows:

Championship standings
The 2013 NACAM Rally Championship points are as follows:

References

External links
Official website

NACAM Rally Championship
NACAM
NACAM Rally Championship
NACAM Rally Championship